Ronit Bose Roy (born 11 October 1965) is an Indian actor, known for his works primarily in Hindi television and films alongside Tamil and Telugu cinema. Roy has earned numerous accolades in his career including a Filmfare Award, two Screen Awards, five ITA Awards, and six Indian Telly Awards.

Early life and background 
Roy was born on 11 October 1965 in Nagpur in a Bengali family. He is the eldest son of a businessman, Brotin Bose Roy and Dolly Roy. His younger brother, Rohit Roy is also a TV actor. Ronit Roy spent his childhood in Ahmedabad, Gujarat. He received primary education from Ankur School, Ahmedabad. After his schooling, Roy pursued hotel management. After completing his studies, he moved to Mumbai and stayed at the residence of filmmaker Subhash Ghai. While Roy was keen to work in the film industry, Subhash Ghai persuaded him, not to pursue it due to the difficulties associated with it. Ronit worked as a management trainee at Mumbai's Sea Rock Hotel. To have experience at all different levels, Ronit's work ranged from dishwashing and cleaning to serving tables and bar-tending.

Career

Film career 
Roy made his debut in the Hindi film industry with Jaan Tere Naam (1992) which was a commercial success. He starred with Aditya Pancholi and Kishori Shahane in Bomb Blast (1993). which was also a commercial success.

After his success on TV, Roy featured in more Hindi films in supporting roles. In 2010, he starred in the critically acclaimed film Udaan; his work was much praised and won him many accolades. Roy's performance was ranked among the 100 greatest performances of the decade list by Film Companion.

Udaan brought Roy back to the film scene. He next starred in films such as Anurag Kashyap's That Girl in Yellow Boots, Karan Johar's Student of the Year, Deepa Mehta's Midnight's Children, Sanjay Gupta's Shootout at Wadala (produced by Ekta Kapoor), and Anurag Kashyap's Ugly.

In 2013, he played the main antagonist in the Akshay Kumar starrer BOSS, and in 2014 he appeared in 2 States in which his performance received much appreciation.

In 2017, he has also shared screen with the Hrithik Roshan playing the role of an antagonist in the thriller film Kaabil. In the same year, he made his debut in Telugu with N.T.R Jr. starrer Jai Lava Kusa, where he played the role of main antagonist Sarkar. He has also appeared in films like Machine (2017), Lucknow Central (2017), and Loveyatri (2018).

Roy was seen next in Puri Jagannadh directed romantic sports film Liger. It will also feature Vijay Deverakonda, Ananya Panday, Ramya Krishnan and Makarand Deshpande.

TV career 
Roy received a call from Balaji Telefilms to offer him a part in the television serial Kammal. Due to the lack of any appealing film offers, he accepted the offer. Before Kammal got started, Balaji Telefilms also offered Ronit for Kasautii Zindagii Kay as Rishabh Bajaj, a middle-aged business tycoon. That also landed him in Balaji Telefilms' Kyunki Saas Bhi Kabhi Bahu Thi as Mihir Virani, replacing Amar Upadhyay and Inder Kumar.

From 2009 to 2011, he played the role of Dharamraj in NDTV Imagine's Bandini, which won him accolades for his astonishing portrayal of a crude and ruthless diamond merchant who is never defeated.

He has also participated in Jhalak Dikhhla Jaa, a dance reality show in 2007, and another show, Yeh Hai Jalwa in 2008 as a contestant. He hosted the Kitchen Champions in 2010 which was on Colors TV.

In 2010, he starred in Sony TV's popular courtroom drama show Adaalat as K.D. Pathak, a sharp unique lawyer who only fights for the truth.

He returned to the drama genre in 2014 with Balaji Telefilms's  Itna Karo Na Mujhe Pyar as Dr. Nachiket Khanna, alias Neil K opposite Pallavi Kulkarni.

In 2016, he starred in Adaalat (season 2) where he reprised his character from the previous season.

Digital career 
In 2018, Roy made his digital debut in an ALTBalaji's web series Kehne Ko Humsafar Hain along with Mona Singh and Gurdeep Kohli.

In 2019, he starred in an Indian crime thriller web series Hostages.

Business venture 
Roy owns Ace Security and Protection agency (AceSquad Security Services LLP). It currently caters to Bollywood actors such as Salman Khan, Amitabh Bachchan, Mithun Chakraborty, Shahrukh Khan, and Aamir Khan; also to Indian Premier League ex-Chairman and ex-Commissioner Lalit Modi and his son Ruchir Modi. Some of the film projects that Ace Security and Protection have also lent their services to are Lagaan, Dil Chahta Hai, Yaadein, Na Tum Jano Na Hum, Saathiya, and Armaan.

Personal life 

Roy was married to a woman named Joanna and they have a daughter named Ona.

On 25 December 2003, he married actress and model Neelam Singh, with whom he has a daughter Aador (born May 2005), and a son Agastya (born October 2007).

Filmography

Film

Television

Web series

Awards

Controversy 
On 27 October 2011, Ronit Roy was arrested by Mumbai police for rash and negligent driving, after he was involved in a road accident in the Amboli suburb of Mumbai. He was returning from a Diwali party when his high speeding Mercedes car hit a Wagon-R injuring people, one of whom was seriously hurt.
However, he got bail within few hours and was released. The initial medical report didn't find any sign of drugs in Ronit Roy's stomach.

See also 

 List of Indian television actors
List of Indian film actors
List of awards and nominations received by Ronit Roy

References

External links 

 
 
 
 Ronit Roy on Forbes

1965 births
Indian male television actors
Indian male film actors
Living people
Male actors in Hindi cinema
Indian male models
Indian television directors
Indian television producers
Film producers from Mumbai
Male actors from Mumbai
Male actors from Nagpur
Hindi film editors
21st-century Indian male actors

Actors from Mumbai
Filmfare Awards winners
Screen Awards winners
Zee Cine Awards winners
Indian male soap opera actors